In mathematics, in particular in measure theory, an inner measure is a function on the power set of a given set, with values in the extended real numbers, satisfying some technical conditions. Intuitively, the inner measure of a set is a lower bound of the size of that set.

Definition 

An inner measure is a set function

defined on all subsets of a set  that satisfies the following conditions:

 Null empty set: The empty set has zero inner measure (see also: measure zero); that is, 
 Superadditive: For any disjoint sets  and  
 Limits of decreasing towers: For any sequence  of sets such that  for each  and  
 Infinity must be approached: If  for a set  then for every positive real number  there exists some  such that

The inner measure induced by a measure 

Let  be a σ-algebra over a set  and  be a measure on  

Essentially  gives a lower bound of the size of any set by ensuring it is at least as big as the -measure of any of its -measurable subsets. Even though the set function  is usually not a measure,  shares the following properties with measures:
 
  is non-negative,
 If  then

Measure completion 

Induced inner measures are often used in combination with outer measures to extend a measure to a larger σ-algebra.
The set function  defined by

for all  is a measure on  known as the completion of

See also

References 

 Halmos, Paul R., Measure Theory, D. Van Nostrand Company, Inc., 1950, pp. 58.
 A. N. Kolmogorov & S. V. Fomin, translated by Richard A. Silverman, Introductory Real Analysis, Dover Publications, New York, 1970,  (Chapter 7)

Measures (measure theory)